Yayan Ruhian (born 19 October 1968) is an Indonesian martial artist and actor. He is known for co-starring in Gareth Evans' films The Raid (2011) as Mad Dog, The Raid 2 (2014) as Prakoso, Star Wars: The Force Awakens (2015) as Tasu Leech, and Beyond Skyline (2017) as the police chief. He reprises this role in Skylines (2020)

Life and career
Yayan was born in Tasikmalaya, West Java, Indonesia on 19 October 1968. By the age of 13, hoping to "show his masculinity", he began studying the traditional martial art pencak silat; his father had practiced karate. Yayan trained with what later became Pencak Silat Tenaga Dasar, eventually becoming a trainer and referee – although he later learned that this disqualified him from participating in tournaments. By the mid-2000s Yayan had taught pencak silat in countries such as Belgium, France, and the Netherlands, and also learned several further martial arts techniques, such as aikido. He also worked as a hand-to-hand instructor for the Indonesian National Police.

In 2008, Yayan was asked by Gareth Evans to help with the choreography for his film Merantau. He also auditioned for the role of Eric, later stating that he did not care if he was cast, so long as he did his best. He received the part, and Merantau was released in 2009. In the film, his character, an antagonistic and diminutive martial artist, is capable of overcoming a considerably larger man in moments. Afterwards, he had several people approach him and ask to study silat, although some called him Eric.

Yayan played Mad Dog in Evans' 2011 film The Raid, and handled the fight choreography together with costar Iko Uwais. Evans described the character as "such an unrelenting, cold, irredeemable psychopath that when he kills someone, he wants to feel it", such that he would rather kill a man bare-handed than shoot him. Manohla Dargis of The New York Times described the character as the film's stand-out, "a commanding physical presence".

After this performance, Yayan's likeness and the term gereget (used by his character) became a memetic image macro on the internet. In a 2014 interview, Yayan stated that he did not mind the memes, as the individuals posting them could not create such macros if they had not seen the film. The magazine Tempo reported in June 2012 that Yayan and Iko had gone to Hollywood to handle choreography for an American remake of the film.

Evans' 2014 release, The Raid 2, cast Yayan as Prakoso, an assassin and confidant of mafia kingpin Bangun (Tio Pakusadewo). Recognising that Yayan had already been identified with Mad Dog, Evans emphasized that Prakoso was a new character: a failed father and husband, aged sixty, who is nevertheless a faithful employee. As with the earlier film, Yayan worked with Iko Uwais on choreography. Charlotte O'Sullivan of the London Evening Standard found Yayan's portrayal of Prakoso "sublime", writing that "when his body starts flying through the air, you feel as if you’re reading his life story".

In mid-2014 it was announced that Yayan would appear in Takashi Miike's Yakuza Apocalypse: The Great War of the Underworld, playing alongside Hayato Ichihara. In this film, penned by Yoshitaka Yamaguchi, a Yakuza member is caught in international intrigue after discovering that his boss is a vampire.

In December 2014 it was reported Yayan would appear in the Indonesian heist action sequel Comic 8: Casino Kings and co-starred in Takashi Miike's action horror film Yakuza Apocalypse: The Great War of the Underworld.

He appeared in Star Wars: The Force Awakens (2015) as Tasu Leech, alongside his co-stars from The Raid and The Raid 2, Iko Uwais and Cecep Arif Rahman.

In 2017, he appeared in the alien invasion movie Beyond Skyline where he played a police chief in Laos credited only as the Chief in the movie. In 2020, he reprised this role in Skylines where his character was given the name Huana.

In 2019, he appeared in John Wick: Chapter 3 – Parabellum as Shinobi #2, one of Zero's students, along with Cecep Arif Rahman as Shinobi #1. He also appeared in the 2019 Malaysian film Wira as Ifrit.

Personal life
Yayan speaks fluent Sundanese, and Indonesian. He also speaks conversational English a little bit. , Yayan has three children, who live with his wife in Tasikmalaya; Yayan, because of his work, must live in Jakarta. Aside from his acting, he teaches pencak silat.

Aside from martial arts, he is also a teacher of inner breathing techniques developed in the Perguruan Silat Tenaga Dasar Indonesia.

Style
On screen, Yayan is often cast in antagonistic roles, portraying characters who speak little but have great endurance, stamina and fighting skills.

Filmography

Film

Television series

Video games

Awards and nominations

References

External links
 
 
 

1968 births
21st-century Indonesian male actors
Indonesian male film actors
Indonesian martial artists
Indonesian Muslims
Living people
People from Tasikmalaya
Sundanese people
Silat practitioners